Vulcan Chaining Prometheus is a 1744 oil on canvas painting by Jean-Charles Frontier, produced as his reception piece for the Académie Royale de peinture. It shows Jupiter (top right with his eagle) ordering the eternal punishment of Prometheus (bottom left), which Vulcan (bottom right) begins. Since 1872 it has been in the collection of the École nationale supérieure des beaux-arts in Paris.

References 

French paintings
1740s paintings
Paintings in the collection of the Beaux-Arts de Paris
Paintings depicting Greek myths
Prometheus
Torture in art
Paintings of Vulcan (mythology)
Paintings of Jupiter (mythology)